Potoška Vas is a village north of Zagorje ob Savi in central Slovenia. The area is part of the traditional region of Upper Carniola. It is now included with the rest of the Municipality of Zagorje ob Savi in the Central Sava Statistical Region.

The Zagorje ob Savi airstrip is located south of the settlement.

References

External links
Potoška Vas on Geopedia

Populated places in the Municipality of Zagorje ob Savi